Geophysical Journal International is a monthly peer-reviewed scientific journal published by Oxford University Press on behalf of the Royal Astronomical Society and the Deutsche Geophysikalische Gesellschaft (German Geophysical Society). The journal publishes original research papers, research notes, letters, and book reviews. It was established in 1922. The editor-in-chief is Joerg Renner (Ruhr University Bochum). The journal covers research on all aspects of theoretical, computational, applied and observational geophysics.

History 
The journal was formerly entitled Geophysical Journal (Oxford) from January 1988 to June 1989. The Geophysical Journal was itself formed by the merger of three other publications: Geophysical Journal of the Royal Astronomical Society, Journal of Geophysics, and Annales Geophysicae, Series B: Terrestrial and Planetary Physics.

Geophysical Journal of the Royal Astronomical Society was in existence from March 1958 to December 1987 and was preceded by Monthly Notices of the Royal Astronomical Society, Geophysical Supplement. The Journal of Geophysics was in existence from 1974 to 1987, and preceded by the German-language journal, Zeitschrift für Geophysik (1924–1973).

Finally, Annales Geophysicae, Series B: Terrestrial and Planetary Physics was in existence from 1986 to 1987, and preceded by Annales Geophysicae (Gauthier-Villars) (1983–1985). Annales Geophysicae was formed by the merger of two other journals: Annales de Géophysique (Centre National de la Recherche Scientifique) (1942–1982), and Annali di Geofisica (1948–1982).

Abstracting and indexing 
The journal is abstracted and indexed in:

According to the Journal Citation Reports, the journal has a 2021 impact factor of 3.352, ranking it 35th out of 100 journals in the category "Geochemistry & Geophysics".

References

External links 
 

Current journal:
 Geophysical Journal International, Volumes 98- (1989–present) Archive
 Geophysical Journal (Oxford), Volumes 92-97 (1988-1989) Archive

Group 1:
 Geophysical Journal of the Royal Astronomical Society, Volumes 1-91 (1958-1987) Archive
 Geophysical Supplements to the Monthly notices of the Royal Astronomical Society, Volumes 1-7 (1922-1957) Archive

Group 2:
 Journal of Geophysics, Volumes 40-62 (1974-1988) 
 Zeitschrift für Geophysik / Journal of Geophysics, Volumes 1-39 (1924-1944,1953-1973) 

Group 3:
 Annales geophysicae. Series B, Terrestrial and planetary physics, Volumes 4-5 (1986-1987) 
 Annales geophysicae, Volumes 1-3 (1983-1985) 
 Annales de Géophysique, Volumes 1-38 (1942–1982) 
 Annali di Geofisica, Volumes  (1948–1982) 

Monthly journals
Geophysics journals
English-language journals
Oxford University Press academic journals
Publications established in 1922
Royal Astronomical Society academic journals